Havin' a Ball at the Village Gate is the last album by the reformed jazz vocal group Lambert, Hendricks & Bavan, of Dave Lambert and Jon Hendricks with Yolande Bavan. The group was formed after Annie Ross left the vocal group in 1962. The album was recorded live at the Village Gate club in New York City on December 20 and 21, 1963.

Track listing 
 "Jumpin' at the Woodside" (Count Basie, Jon Hendricks) - 4:08
 "Meetin' Time" (Hendricks) - 4:22
 "Days of Wine and Roses" (Henry Mancini, Johnny Mercer) - 3:06
 "Rusty Dusty Blues" (J. Mayo Williams, Hendricks) - 3:46
 "Three Blind Mice" (Hendricks) - 3:41
 "Nothin' for Nothin'" (Hendricks) - 3:31
 "With 'er 'ead Tucked Underneath'er Arm" (Bert Lee, R.P. Weston) - 3:17
 "It's Sand Man" (Ed Lewis, Hendricks) - 2:57
 "I Wonder What's Become of Sally" (Jack Yellen, Milton Ager) - 4:08
 "Stops and Goes Blues" (Hendricks) - 3:20

Personnel 
Dave Lambert, Jon Hendricks, Yolande Bavan  – vocals
Thad Jones - cornet, flugelhorn
Booker Ervin - tenor saxophone
Gildo Mahones – piano
George Tucker – double bass
Jimmie Smith – drums

References 

 

1963 live albums
Albums recorded at the Village Gate
Lambert, Hendricks & Ross albums
Albums produced by George Avakian
RCA Records live albums
Live vocal jazz albums